Phasi Charoen station is a Bangkok MRT rapid transit station served by Blue Line, located above Phet Kasem Road located in Bangkok, Thailand.

The station is close to Soi Phet Kasem 54 where Phasi Charoen District Office is situated and it has a connection to the shopping mall Seacon Bangkae by elevated pathway.

Gallery

References 

 This article incorporates material from the corresponding article in the Thai Wikipedia.

MRT (Bangkok) stations
2019 establishments in Thailand
Railway stations opened in 2019